Tourcoing is a city in northern France on the Belgian border. It is designated municipally as a commune within the department of Nord. Located to the north-northeast of Lille, adjacent to Roubaix, Tourcoing is the chef-lieu of two cantons and the fourth largest city in the French region of Hauts-de-France ranked by population with about 97,000 inhabitants.

Together with the cities of Lille, Roubaix, Villeneuve-d'Ascq and eighty-six other communes, Tourcoing is part of four-city-centred metropolitan area inhabited by more than 1.1 million people: the Métropole Européenne de Lille. To a greater extent, Tourcoing belongs to a vast conurbation formed with the Belgian cities of Mouscron, Kortrijk and Tournai, which gave birth to the first European Grouping of Territorial Cooperation in January 2008, Lille–Kortrijk–Tournai with an aggregate of just over 2 million inhabitants.

History

The city was the site of a significant victory for France during the French Revolutionary Wars. Marshal Charles Pichegru and his generals Joseph Souham and Jean Moreau defeated a combined force of British and Austrian troops in the Battle of Tourcoing on 29 Floréal II (18 May 1794).

Population

Main sights
Church of St Christopher (15th-16th centuries), considered one of the most beautiful Neo-Gothic edifices of Nord.
Hospice de Havre, founded in 1260. The cloister and the chapel date from the seventeenth century.
Hôtel de ville  (1885), in Napoleon III-style.
Jardin botanique de Tourcoing, a botanical garden and arboretum.

Transport
The Tourcoing station is a railway station offering direct connections to Lille and Paris (high speed trains), Kortrijk, Ostend, Ghent and Antwerp. The town was formerly served by the Somain-Halluin Railway.

Notable people
Yohan Cabaye, footballer 
Jean-Marc Degraeve, chess grandmaster
Stéphane Denève, conductor
Brigitte Fossey, actress
Anna Gomis, wrestler
 Henri Padou, water polo player and 1924 Olympic gold medallist 
Brigitte Lahaie, pornstar
Joseph-Charles Lefèbvre, bishop of Bourges, cardinal, cousin of
Marcel Lefebvre, missionary priest and, later, controversial archbishop, cousin of Joseph-Charles
Mr. Sam, a popular deejay and producer running his own record label since 2008.
Albert Roussel, composer
Yves Devernay, organist

Guilbert de Lannoy (1545-) and his son Jean de Lannoy (1575-) were Protestants from Tourcoing who resettled in Leiden, Holland. Jean's son, Philip Delano ( - ; born Philipe de la Noye or Philipe de Lannoy), was an early emigrant to the Plymouth Colony and progenitor of the prominent Delano family, which counts among its descendants prominent figures in American history, including president Franklin Roosevelt.

Notable Startups 

In 2013, Maxime Piquette and Charles De Potter founded iCreo, a digital audio company in Tourcoing. The company created RadioKing, a platform for internet radio, and Ausha, a platform for podcast hosting and marketing. It received support from regional funders, Nord France Amorquage and IRD Gestion. The company is now the platform for media outlets Le Figaro, Liberation, l'Équipe and AFP, as well as large corporations and independent content producers.

International relations

Twin towns - sister cities
Tourcoing is twinned with:

 Biella, Italy
 Bottrop, Germany
 Jastrzębie-Zdrój, Poland
 Mitte (Berlin), Germany
 Mühlhausen, Germany
 Partyzanski (Minsk), Belarus

Other forms of cooperation
 Guimarães, Portugal
 Mouscron, Belgium
 Rochdale, England

See also
 Battle of Tourcoing (1794)
 Free Institution of Sacred Heart
 Communes of the Nord department
 Verlaine Message Museum

References

External links

 Tourcoing town council website (in French)
 Tourcoing Volley-Ball Lille Métropole (Official website of the top team, in French)
 See pictures from Antonio Mucherino's web site

 
Communes of Nord (French department)
French Flanders